Vasilissis Sofias Avenue is a major avenue in the east side of Athens, the Greek capital.  The avenue was originally part of the Kifisias Avenue. The part from Syntagma Square to the intersection with Alexandras Avenue was renamed after Queen Sophia, the consort of King Constantine I. The avenue begins at the intersections of Amalias Avenue and Panepistimiou Street and ends by Alexandras, Kifissias and Mesogeion Avenues as well as Feidippou Street, with a total length of approximately 3 km. A section of the avenue is part of the old GR-1, and a branch of GR-54.

As many historical buildings and landmarks are located on the avenue, such as the Old Royal Palace (today housing the Greek Parliament) and the National Gardens of Athens, the mansions of very important Greeks and foreigners (today most of them housing embassies and museums) (e.g. the residence of the Greek Prime Minister Eleutherios Venizelos-now part of the British embassy, the mansion of Sophie de Marbois-Lebrun, Duchess of Plaisance-now the Byzantine and Christian Museum, the mansion of business magnate and tycoon Othon Stathatos-today part of the Goulandris Museum of Cycladic Art), Vasilissis Sofias Avenue is one of the most chic and prestigious streets in the Greek capital. Because of the very high price of land on this street, most of the buildings seen on Vasilissis Sofias Avenue were mainly built in the 1950s-1960s, but others built in the beginnings of the 20th century are also commonly seen. Except from residences, medical doctors' private practices, banks, museums, embassies and high-end hotels are common on this historical street.

The westbound lanes turn into Amalias Avenue and Panepistimiou Street, and the northbound of Amalias turns into  Vasileias Sofias Avenue and Panepistimiou Street ;  there is no traffic flow from the eastbound of Panepistimiou Street as it forms a one-way route westbound, and since the 2000s transit traffic has been excluded. Three Athens Metro stations (Line 3) are on, or near, Vassilissis Sofias Avenue: Syntagma, Evangelismos, Megaro Moussikis (the Evangelismos station is on the avenue).

History
The avenue was first paved in the 20th century and added trolley lanes by the ends of the avenue,  with  neo-classical buildings also taking shape by the avenue.  After World War II and the Greek Civil War, it added modern eight-to-ten storey buildings in most of the intersection (mainly to the north)  with traffic  and street lights  installed.  Today's Vassilissis Sofias Avenue has,  on its west side, four lanes westbound and two lanes eastbound,  while beyond, the rest of the avenue takes in three lanes, including a bus lane and  intersection by Vasileos Konstantinou Avenue and Vasileos Alexandrou Street.

Intersections
Amalias Avenue and Panepistimiou Street
Akadimias Street, north
Solonos Street, north
Koubari and Herodou Attikou streets
Ploutarchou and Rizari Streets
Marasli Street
Vasileos Konstantinou Avenue and Vasileos Alexandrou Street
Papadiamantopoulou Street
D. Soutsou Street
Mesogeion Avenue
Alexandras and Kifissias Avenue

Major buildings on Vassilissis Sofias Avenue
Culture

Benaki Museum
National Gardens of Athens
Stathatos Mansion, part of the Goulandris Museum of Cycladic Art
Athens War Museum
National Gallery (Athens)
Athens Concert Hall
Byzantine and Christian Museum

Education

Academy of Art

Institutions
 Greek Parliament
 Offices of the EU in Athens
 National Research Institute
 Embassy of Argentina, Athens
 Embassy of France, Athens
 Embassy of Serbia, Athens
 Embassy of the United Kingdom, Athens
 Embassy of the United States in Athens
 Embassy of Portugal, Athens
 Embassy of Brazil, Athens
 European Network and Information Security Agency

Hospitals

Aretaieion Hospital
Alexandra Hospital
Ippokrateion Hospital

Hotels
Hilton Athens

See also

List of streets in Athens

Streets in Athens